Mala Strmica is a settlement in the Municipality of Šmarješke Toplice in southeastern Slovenia. It lies in the hills northwest of Šmarjeta in the historical region of Lower Carniola. The municipality is now included in the Southeast Slovenia Statistical Region.

References

External links
Mala Strmica at Geopedia

Populated places in the Municipality of Šmarješke Toplice